Jabah  is a Syrian village located in Quneitra District, Quneitra. According to the Syria Central Bureau of Statistics (CBS), Jabah had a population of 5,281 in the 2004 census.

History
In 1596 Jabah appeared in the Ottoman tax registers under the name of Jaba, situated in the nahiya (subdistrict) of Jaydur in the Hauran Sanjak. It had an entirely Muslim population of 30 households and 23 bachelors. They paid a fixed tax-rate of 40% on agricultural products, including  wheat, barley, summer crops, fruit  trees, goats and bee-hives; in addition to occasional revenues. Their total tax was 8,500 akçe, with all of it going to a waqf (religious trust).

References

Bibliography

External links
 Qnaitra-map 19 K

Towns in Quneitra Governorate